Trapped: Haitian Nights is a thriller recorded in 2010. It stars Vivica A. Fox and Kenya Moore and was directed by Jean-Claude La Marre. It was released on DVD on February 8, 2011.

References

External links 

2011 thriller films
2011 films
Haitian thriller films
Films directed by Jean-Claude La Marre
English-language Haitian films